Skunkworks is the third studio album by Iron Maiden frontman Bruce Dickinson, released in 1996. It is the first and only studio album recorded with the musicians Dickinson put together for the tour supporting the album Balls to Picasso. They disbanded by the end of 1996.

Overview
Bruce Dickinson had intended Skunkworks to be the debut album of a band by the same name. However, his label would not issue the record under any name other than Bruce Dickinson. The album moved from Iron Maiden's heavy metal style to an alternative metal sound similar to bands such as Rush and Soundgarden. The album name refers to the Lockheed code name for an elite military design group. It was produced by Jack Endino, best known for Nirvana's debut album Bleach.

"I had this argument with (my manager) Rod," Dickinson recalled, "and he told me, 'You're a heavy metal singer. You can't change. You can try, but you're stuck with it.' I object to that… I don't mind being a heavy metal singer, but I object to anyone telling me I can't fucking change… Anyway, off we went into the Skunkworks thing… At the end of it all, I was gutted. I should have had a grunge career right then, because I was very angry, very disaffected and I was poor."

The band began touring in the UK and the US in August 1996 in support of the album. Despite his musical evolution, the tour for the album was the first on which Dickinson included a song from his former band: a slightly reworked version of "The Prisoner". Live performances were recorded and filmed in Pamplona and Gerona, Spain on 31 May and 1 June 1996 and four songs were released in an EP titled Skunkworks Live in Japan only in October 1996, through Victor Entertainment. A live video of the shows was released in Japan as Skunkworks Live Video.

The band did not last and, for his next solo project, Accident of Birth, Dickinson reunited with guitarist Roy Z (from Balls to Picasso).

A 2005 rerelease of Skunkworks included previously unreleased songs, and the Skunkworks Live EP.

Cover art
Hipgnosis designer Storm Thorgerson produced the cover art, starting with a hired tree with foliage shaped somewhat like a brain – a play on the town of Braintree, Essex. The tree was trucked to a lake in Scotland, and a photograph was taken with Dickinson standing under the tree. Hipgnosis freelance artist Richard Manning digitally shaped the foliage in Photoshop, and a mirror image was applied. Alterations were made to each side to break the mirrored perfection. Inside the album, bandmember faces were also represented in mirror image, showing one side of their face copied to the other side.

Track listings

Personnel
Band members
Bruce Dickinson – vocals
Alex Dickson – guitar
Chris Dale – bass
Alessandro Elena – drums

Production
Jack Endino – producer, engineer, mixing at Lansdowne Studios, London
Adi Winman – assistant engineer
Jeff Mann – mixing assistant
Ian Cooper – mastering at Metropolis, London

Charts

Album

Singles

Back from the Edge

References

Bruce Dickinson albums
1996 albums
Albums with cover art by Storm Thorgerson
Albums produced by Jack Endino
Castle Communications albums